Love & War is an American sitcom television series which aired on CBS from September 21, 1992, to February 1, 1995.

Created by Diane English, the series originally starred Susan Dey as Wally Porter, a New York City restaurateur, and Jay Thomas as Jack Stein, a newspaper columnist with whom she had an on-again, off-again romance.

After the first season, however, the show was retooled and Dey was fired by the producers of the show, saying that she and Thomas had "no chemistry" together.  She was replaced by Annie Potts as Dana Palladino, who bought Porter's restaurant and also became a love interest for Jack.

The first season also featured moments when Jack or Wally would break the fourth wall and address the camera directly, generally using it as an opportunity to discuss an emotional crisis. This technique was dropped in later seasons.

One episode featured a guest appearance from Jerry Seinfeld and Larry David as themselves; they did this as a "thank you" to creator Diane English for allowing a brief scene on Murphy Brown in an episode of Seinfeld where Kramer is cast as the titular character's secretary.

The show's supporting cast included Suzie Plakson, Joanna Gleason, Joel Murray, Charlie Robinson and Michael Nouri.  John Hancock, who had a recurring role as a judge on L.A. Law with Susan Dey previously, portrayed bartender Ike for the first half of season one, until he died of a heart attack in late 1992. His death was subsequently written into the series and he was replaced by actor Charlie Robinson.

Cast
Jay Thomas as Jack Stein
Susan Dey as Wally Porter (1992–93)
John Hancock as Ike Johnson (1992)
Joel Murray as Ray Litvak
Michael Nouri as Kip Zakaris
Suzie Plakson as Meg Tynan
Joanna Gleason as Nadine Berkus
Charlie Robinson as Abe Johnson (1992–95)
Annie Potts as Dana Palladino (1993–95)

Episodes

Scheduling
In its first two and a half seasons, the show aired on Monday nights following another Diane English production, Murphy Brown. Midway through its third season, it was moved to Wednesday nights where ratings sagged, leading to its cancellation.

Awards and nominations
Potts was nominated for an Emmy Award for Outstanding Lead Actress - Comedy Series in 1994, but lost to Candice Bergen. Guest stars Tracey Ullman and Eileen Heckart won Emmys for Outstanding Guest Actress in a Comedy Series in 1993 and 1994, respectively, while Sid Caesar was nominated for Outstanding Guest Actor in a Comedy Series in 1995, but did not win.

The show was also a nominee for Outstanding Main Title Theme Music in 1993.

References

External links
 

CBS original programming
1990s American sitcoms
1992 American television series debuts
1995 American television series endings
Primetime Emmy Award-winning television series
Television shows set in Chicago
Television series created by Diane English